Comilla Sadar Dakshin Upazila (Comilla Central South Upazila) is an upazila of Comilla District in Chattogram Division, Bangladesh.

Administration
Comilla Sadar Dakshin Upazila is divided into Comilla Dakshin Municipality (part of the city of Comilla) and 14 union parishads:

Bagmara Dakshin, Bagmara Uttar, Baropara, Belgor Dakshin, Belgor Uttar, Bhuloin Dakshin, Bhuloin Uttar, Bijoypur, Chuwara, Goliara, Pachim Jorkanon, Purba Jorkanon, Perul Dakshin, and Perul Uttar. The union parishads are subdivided into 318 mauzas and 375 villages.

After the separation of Lalmai Upazila, the upazila now has 6 union parishads:

 Barapara
 Bijoypur
 Chouara
 Galiara
 Paschim Jorekaran
 Purba Jorekaran

Comilla Dakshin Municipality is subdivided into 9 wards and 63 mahallas.

Demographics 

After the separation of Lalmai Upazila, Comilla Sadar Dakshin upazila had a population of 258,278 living in 50,621 households. Comilla Sadar Dakshin upazila has a sex ratio of 1007 females per 1000 males. 111,891 (43.32%) live in urban areas. 248,420 (96.18%) are Muslims and 9,439 (3.65%) Hindus.

See also
 Upazilas of Bangladesh
 Districts of Bangladesh
 Divisions of Bangladesh

References

Upazilas of Comilla District
Comilla Sadar Dakshin Upazila